The Porto Pí Lighthouse is one of the oldest operating lighthouses in the world, and a historic monument.  It is located in Palma harbour on the Balearic Island of Majorca.

See also 

 List of lighthouses in Spain
 List of lighthouses in the Balearic Islands

References

External links 
 Comisión de faros
 Balearic Lighthouses

Lighthouses in the Balearic Islands
Buildings and structures in Palma de Mallorca
Lighthouses completed in 1617
1617 establishments in Spain
Bien de Interés Cultural landmarks in the Balearic Islands